{{DISPLAYTITLE:C2H3N}}
The molecular formula C2H3N (molar mass: 41.05 g/mol, exact mass: 41.0265 u) may refer to:

 Acetonitrile (MeCN)
 Azirine
 Methyl isocyanide, or isocyanomethane
 
 Ethenimine